Anomalotrema is a genus of trematodes in the family Opecoelidae.

Species
 Anomalotrema koiae Gibson & Bray, 1984
 Anomalotrema putjatini Zhukov, 1957

References

Further reading
 Cribb, T. H. (2005). Family Opecoelidae Ozaki, 1925. 13b. Anomalotrema Zhukov, 1957. In Jones, Arlene, Bray, Rodney A. & Gibson, David I. (Eds.), Keys to the Trematoda, Volume 2 (p. 492). London, UK: CABI Publishing and The Natural History Museum. .
 Gibson, David I. (1996). Anomalotrema Zhukov, 1957. In Gibson, David I., Trematoda (pp. 159–160, 161). In Margolis, L. & Kabata, Z. (Eds.), Guide to the Parasites of Fishes of Canada. Ottawa: NRC Research Press. .

Plagiorchiida
Trematode genera